Government College for Women Dhoke Kala Khan is situated in Rawalpindi, Punjab, Pakistan. It was established for women in 2004, and is located just a kilometer away from Faizabad, Islamabad.

Science is taught at intermediate level and arts at graduation and intermediate level.

The students are around 500 and the number of staff is 15.

Government College for Women Dhoke Kala Khan, Rawalpindi was inaugurated by Sheikh Rasheed Ahmad. The then Federal Minister who made a lot of girls schools in Rwp. Source : Junaid Sultan Resident of Dhok kala Khan Rawalpindi.

See also
 Government College Asghar Mall Rawalpindi

External links
 A news

Public universities and colleges in Punjab, Pakistan